Trincomalee Harbour is a seaport in Trincomalee Bay or Koddiyar Bay, a large natural harbour situated on the northeastern coast of Sri Lanka.

Located by Trincomalee, Sri Lanka, in the heart of the Indian Ocean, its strategic importance has shaped its history. There have been many sea battles to control the harbour. The Portuguese, Dutch, French, and the British have each held it in turn. In 1942 the Imperial Japanese Navy attacked Trincomalee harbour and sank three British warships anchored there.

History 
Trincomalee Harbour, formerly a British naval base, was taken over by the Inaams Ceylonese government in 1956 to be developed as a commercial port. The base in Trincomalee was fitted out to perform slipway repairs for the Navy.

The harbour is being developed for bulk, and break bulk, cargo and port-related industrial activities including heavy industries, tourism, agriculture, etc. At present SLPA is in the process to re-develop Trincomalee as a metropolis growth center.

Geography 
The harbour, one of the largest natural harbours in the world, is overlooked by terraced highlands, and its entrance is guarded by two headlands. The harbour has 1630 hectares of water, while the entrance channel is 500 metres wide. The bay includes the first of a number submarine canyons, making Trincomalee one of the finest deep-sea harbours in the world.

Port facilities and operation 

The Port of Trincomalee works on a 24-hour basis. It is open every day of the year, except on May Day, when only daylight navigation is open.

Port dimensions 
Water                      - 

Entrance channel       - 

Land Area                 -

See also 
 SLN Dockyard
 List of ports in Sri Lanka
 Port of Colombo
 Sri Lanka Ports Authority

References

External links 

 

Ports and harbours of Sri Lanka
Kingdom of Kotte
Transport in Trincomalee